Tovarnik railway station is a railway station on Novska–Tovarnik railway. Located in Tovarnik, Croatia. Railroad continued to Đeletovci in one and the other direction to Šid. Tovarnik railway station consists of 5 railway track.

Gallery

See also 
 Croatian Railways
 Zagreb–Belgrade railway

References 

Railway stations in Croatia